In mathematics, an algebraic structure  consisting of a non-empty set   and a ternary mapping  may be called a ternary system. A planar ternary ring (PTR) or ternary field is special type of ternary system used by Marshall Hall to construct projective planes by means of coordinates. Thus, we can think of a planar ternary ring as a generalization of a field where the ternary operation takes the place of both addition and multiplication. In effect, in computer architecture, this ternary operation is known, e.g., as the multiply–accumulate operation (MAC).

There is wide variation in the terminology.  Planar ternary rings or ternary fields as defined here have been called by other names in the literature, and the term "planar ternary ring" can mean a variant of the system defined here. The term "ternary ring" often means a planar ternary ring, but it can also simply mean a ternary system.

Definition

 ;
 ;
 , there is a unique  such that : ;
 , there is a unique , such that ; and
 , the equations  have a unique solution .

When  is finite, the third and fifth axioms are equivalent in the presence of the fourth.

No other pair (0', 1') in  can be found such that  still satisfies the first two axioms.

Binary operations

Addition
Define . The structure  is a loop with identity element 0.

Multiplication
Define . The set  is closed under this multiplication.  The structure  is also a loop, with identity element 1.

Linear PTR
A planar ternary ring  is said to be linear if .
For example, the planar ternary ring associated to a quasifield is (by construction) linear.

Connection with projective planes

Let
 , and 
 .

Then define, the incidence relation  in this way:

Every projective plane can be constructed in this way, starting with an appropriate planar ternary ring.  However, two nonisomorphic planar ternary rings can lead to the construction of isomorphic projective planes.

Conversely, given any projective plane π, by choosing four points, labelled o, e, u, and v, no three of which lie on the same line, coordinates can be introduced in π so that these special points are given the coordinates: o = (0,0), e = (1,1), v = and u = (0). The ternary operation is now defined on the coordinate symbols (except ) by y = T(x,a,b) if and only if the point (x,y) lies on the line which joins (a) with (0,b). The axioms defining a projective plane are used to show that this gives a planar ternary ring. 

Linearity of the PTR is equivalent to a geometric condition holding in the associated projective plane.

Related algebraic structures
PTR's which satisfy additional algebraic conditions are given other names. These names are not uniformly applied in the literature.
 
A linear PTR whose additive loop is associative (and thus a group ), is called a cartesian group. In a cartesian group, the mappings

, and

must be permutations whenever . Since cartesian groups are groups under addition, we revert to using a simple "+" for the additive operation.

A quasifield is a cartesian group satisfying the right distributive law:
.
Addition in any quasifield is commutative.

A semifield is a quasifield which also satisfies the left distributive law:

A planar nearfield is a quasifield whose multiplicative loop is associative (and hence a group). Not all nearfields are planar nearfields.

Notes

References
 
 
 
 
 
 
 
 
 
 
 
 

Algebraic structures
Projective geometry